Nesocodon is a monotypic genus of flowering plants within the family Campanulaceae. The sole species is Nesocodon mauritianus, formerly known as Wahlenbergia mauritiana, which is endemic to the island of Mauritius.

It was the first plant ever discovered that produces red-colored nectar. It was originally thought to have been pollinated by birds, however, recent investigations have demonstrated that day geckos (Phelsuma ornata) are the preferred pollinator of these flowers whereas birds functioned as nectar thieves. The red-whiskered bulbul (Pycnonotus jocosus) robs it of its nectar.

It is closely related to Heterochaenia from the Mascarene Islands, but has single flowers rather than panicles of several.

References

Campanuloideae
Monotypic Campanulaceae genera
Endemic flora of Mauritius